Frederick Rowe may refer to:
 Frederick W. Rowe (1863–1946), U.S. Representative from New York
 Frederick William Rowe (1912–1994), Canadian politician and Senator
 Frederick B. Rowe (born 1937), Canadian politician
 F. J. Rowe (1844–1909), professor of English literature